Runcorn State High School is a government funded school located in Brisbane, Queensland, Australia. It was established in 1986 and has a population of about 1150 students in Years 7 to 12 (aged 12 to 17), 90+ teaching staff, and 40+ support staff.

Students are sorted into pastoral care groups within their year levels and populate from 20 - 25 in each group.
The PCs are simply named as consecutive letters.
There are four sporting Houses which are: Selsey (Yellow), Tarsett (Green), Nathan (Red) & Sirett (Black).

Compulsory subjects; through all year levels include Maths and English. In the junior school, students must also study SOSE, Science, Physical Education and a language. Students have other options such as drama, media, art or business.

Notable alumni
Australian-American Nick Vujicic, Australian-American Christian evangelist and motivational speaker Cameron Bairstow.

References

External links
Runcorn State High School - Official website

Public high schools in Brisbane
Educational institutions established in 1986
1986 establishments in Australia